The 5th constituency of Seine-et-Marne is a French legislative constituency in the Seine-et-Marne département.

Description

The 5th constituency of Seine-et-Marne is located in the North East of the department.

Like much of Seine-et-Marne the seat has a long tradition of electing conservative deputies. The current representative Franck Riester and his predecessor Guy Drut have both been mayors of Coulommiers.

Historic representation

Election results

2022

 
 
 
 
 
 
 
 
|-
| colspan="8" bgcolor="#E9E9E9"|
|-

2017

 
 
 
 
 
 
 
|-
| colspan="8" bgcolor="#E9E9E9"|
|-

2012

 
 
 
 
 
 
|-
| colspan="8" bgcolor="#E9E9E9"|
|-

2007

 
 
 
 
 
 
 
|-
| colspan="8" bgcolor="#E9E9E9"|
|-

2002

 
 
 
 
|-
| colspan="8" bgcolor="#E9E9E9"|
|-

1997

 
 
 
 
 
 
 
|-
| colspan="8" bgcolor="#E9E9E9"|
|-

Sources

Official results of French elections from 2002: "Résultats électoraux officiels en France" (in French).

5